Hopperton railway station served the village of Hopperton, North Yorkshire, England from 1848 to 1962 on the Harrogate line.

History 
The station opened on 30 October 1848 as Allerton by the East and West Yorkshire Junction Railway. The station was situated immediately west of the A1 bridge. Goods facilities were installed on the north side of the running line with a crossing immediately west of the entrance to the cattle dock. Two sidings served six coal  cells. Movements in the goods yard were controlled by flags. In 1911, the census revealed that a population of 457 was served at Allerton station and NER statistics showed that only 5,901 tickets were issued that year whereas  had sold 15,169 and  had sold 191,752. The principal goods traffic handled at the station was 421 tons of barley and 367 tons of potatoes and 41 wagons of livestock were dispatched from the station. Coal was received via rail. The station's name was eventually changed to Hopperton on 21 September 1925 to avoid confusion with the Allerton station in Liverpool. The York - Harrogate line had no Sunday services for most of its life until one appeared in the July 1937 Bradshaw timetable, but none called at Hopperton. From May 1943 there was a slight decline in services from seven trains to York and six to Harrogate to six to York and five to Harrogate. Sunday services were also stopped. The station survived nationalisation but its trains services were almost annihilated as seen in the summer 1958 timetable, with only two trains going to York and one to York on Saturdays only. The station was one of four on the line to close to passengers, the other three being Hessay, Marston Moor and Goldsborough on 15 September 1958. The station closed to goods traffic on 5 November 1962.

References

External links 

Disused railway stations in North Yorkshire
Former North Eastern Railway (UK) stations
Railway stations in Great Britain opened in 1848
Railway stations in Great Britain closed in 1958
1848 establishments in England
1962 disestablishments in England